Josefin Malmqvist (born 1987) is a Swedish politician.  she serves as Member of the Riksdag representing the constituency of Stockholm County. She was also elected as Member of the Riksdag in September 2022. She is affiliated with the Moderate Party.

References 

Living people
1987 births
Place of birth missing (living people)
21st-century Swedish politicians
21st-century Swedish women politicians
Members of the Riksdag 2018–2022
Members of the Riksdag 2022–2026
Members of the Riksdag from the Moderate Party
Women members of the Riksdag